Elrose Mine Airport  is an airport that serves the Eloise Copper Mine in northwest Queensland, Australia,  southeast of Cloncurry and  of McKinlay, in the vicinity of Mount Isa.

See also
 List of airports in Queensland

References

Airports in Queensland